Leptosiphon nuttallii is a species of flowering plant in the phlox family known by the common name Nuttall's linanthus.

It is native to much of western North America, including the Western United States from California to New Mexico and Montana, and Northwestern Mexico. It is known from many types of habitat.

It is native to the Klamath Mountains, Northern California Coast Ranges and Sierra Nevada in Northern California; and the Inyo Mountains, Peninsular Ranges, Transverse Ranges, and White Mountains in Southern California.

Description
Leptosiphon nuttallii is a perennial herb producing a patch of small, hairy stems up to about 20 centimeters tall. Each leaf is divided into usually five very narrow, needlelike lobes.

The inflorescence is a cluster of flowers, each with white corolla lobes about half a centimeter long each joined at a yellowish throat.

Subspecies
Subspecies include:
Leptosiphon nuttallii ssp. howellii, Mt. Tedoc linanthus — a rare subspecies known from just a few populations deep within the Yolla Bolly-Middle Eel Wilderness in the Klamath Mountains, Northern California. It is California Department of Fish and Wildlife and IUCN listed Endangered species, and is on the California Native Plant Society Inventory of Rare and Endangered Plants.
Leptosiphon nuttallii ssp. nuttallii — the most widespread subspecies, including in the Cascade Range and Rocky Mountains.
Leptosiphon nuttallii ssp. pubescens — endemic to the Eastern Sierra Nevada and Great Basin region in California and Nevada.
Leptosiphon nuttallii ssp. tenuilobus — native to Arizona and New Mexico.

References

External links
 Calflora Database: Leptosiphon nuttallii (Nuttall's linanthus)
Jepson Manual eFlora (TJM2) treatment of Leptosiphon nuttallii
UC CalPhotos gallery: Leptosiphon nuttallii

nuttallii
Flora of Northwestern Mexico
Flora of the Northwestern United States
Flora of the Southwestern United States
Flora of California
Flora of the Cascade Range
Flora of the Great Basin
Flora of New Mexico
Flora of the Rocky Mountains
Flora of the Sierra Nevada (United States)
Natural history of the California Coast Ranges
Natural history of the Peninsular Ranges
Natural history of the Transverse Ranges
Flora without expected TNC conservation status